Plant Life Records was a record label that existed from 1977 until 1984. It was formed by Nigel Pegrum, at that time drummer for Steeleye Span. Maddy Prior recorded one album for the label, as did Wizz Jones in 1977. Its most successful recordings were by The Tannahill Weavers and Blowzabella. Most of the thirty or so albums were produced by Pegrum and seven were produced by Paul James. Late in its life, the label began issuing records under licence from other labels and was linked to the Burlington record label, which was also issued with the Plant Life logo on the later labels.

Discography

References

See also
 List of record labels

British record labels
Record labels established in 1979
Record labels disestablished in 1984
Folk record labels